Arley is a civil parish in the North Warwickshire district of Warwickshire, England. The parish includes two settlements, New Arley and Old Arley. Old Arley is to the west of the Bourne Brook and the Birmingham to Peterborough Line, and New Arley is to the east. Nearby places are Ansley and Astley. Old Arley contains the medieval church of St Wilfred's, and a nearby Methodist church. New Arley contains St Michael's Church of England and St Joseph's Catholic Church. The two Anglican churches form one ecclesiastical parish, and St Joseph's is run from St Anne's.

Collieries

Arley Colliery
Arley's mining industry ended in 1968. The village once had an eponymous colliery running beneath part of its central area which employed 1,734 men when it was finally closed on 30 March 1968, by the National Coal Board. It had then been in operation for sixty six years and had once been owned and operated by the Arley Colliery Company Ltd. Production began at the pit on 1 January 1901 and the first coal was extracted from the mine in 1902. The mine was considered no longer economically viable by the NCB led by Lord Robens, officially of the Labour Party, in 1968, due to its relatively high costs and despite the cited fact that one hundred years of coal remained beneath. As production increased the colliery expanded and with this the population within the parish increased. This led to a need for new housing in the area. Between 1920 and 1955 six hundred houses were built on land which had been the Fir Tree Farm, this became New Arley.

Daw Mill, Kingsbury and Dexter Collieries
The two shafts that served Daw Mill were first sunk between 1956 and 1959, and 1969 and 1971 respectively.  Daw Mill was a natural extension of the former collieries, Kingsbury Colliery and Dexter Colliery.  On 7 March 2013 the owner, UK Coal, announced the Daw Mill mine towards the edge of the parish would be closed following a major fire - it was the last remaining colliery in the West Midlands.

Demography
The usual number of residents in the civil parish which includes the slightly larger village of New Arley, was 2,853.

Industries of Work
The working population worked as set out below in the official industry categorisations in 2011:

Nationality
The ward is relatively representative of the nation as a whole in terms of national identity: Those who replied that there were no people in the household with English as their main language formed a proportion of the population 3.6% lower than the national average.

Economic Status
The proportions of those retired, unemployed and who were students in 2011 were extremely close to the national averages, with a slightly higher degree of the retired and lower degree of students, whereas those in the economically inactive (other) category were fewer:

Religion

Notes

References

Civil parishes in Warwickshire
Borough of North Warwickshire